Molopinus pilipes is a species of beetle in the family Carabidae, the only species in the genus Molopinus.

References

Pterostichinae